The 1975–76 Iraq FA Cup was the first edition of the Iraq FA Cup as a clubs-only competition, after the inaugural edition in the 1948–49 season included both clubs and institute-representative teams. The tournament was won by Al-Zawraa, beating Al-Baladiyat 5–0 in the final. Al-Zawraa also won the 1975–76 Iraqi National League to complete the first national double in Iraqi football.

Bracket

Matches

Final

References

External links
 Iraqi Football Website

Iraq FA Cup
Cup